Harpullia hillii, commonly known as blunt-leaved tulip or oblong-leaved tulip, is a tree in the family Sapindaceae, endemic to eastern Australia. It occurs in dry rainforest from the Burdekin River in Queensland southwards to Wauchope, New South Wales.

The species was formally described in 1859 by Victorian government botanist Ferdinand von Mueller based on plant material collected by Walter Hill, first superintendent of the Brisbane Botanic Gardens.

The species is cultivated for its dense foliage and ornamental, but inedible,  berries. It prefers a partially shaded situation, protected from frost. Plants may be propagated from fresh seeds pre-soaked in water.

Botany 
Although the species may grow to 20 metres high, most trees are less than 10 metres high. Each leaf comprises 4 to 12 leaflets, that are oblong or elliptic oblong and between 5 and 15 cm long and 2 to 6 cm wide. White flowers with petals 10–12 mm long appear in panicles that are 10–25 cm long.

Orange fruit positioned above the persistent sepals follow, they are 25–30 mm in diameter and 12–14 mm long. The fruit becomes woody with age. The glossy black seeds protrude from red arils.

Ecology 
The larvae of the Common Pencilled-blue butterfly (Candalides absimilis) feed on the species.

Harpullia hillii was depicted, together with Mackinlaya macrosciadea, in a watercolour by botanical illustrator Ellis Rowan in 1887.

References 

hillii
Flora of New South Wales
Flora of Queensland
Taxa named by Ferdinand von Mueller